Vincent Euvrard (born 12 March 1982) is a Belgian professional football manager and former player who manages RWDM47 in the Belgian First Division B.

References

External links
 

Belgian footballers
1982 births
Living people
Belgian Pro League players
Challenger Pro League players
Eredivisie players
Cercle Brugge K.S.V. players
K.R.C. Genk players
FC Den Bosch players
Lommel S.K. players
Sint-Truidense V.V. players
Cercle Brugge K.S.V. managers
Oud-Heverlee Leuven managers
Association football defenders
Belgian football managers
Belgian First Division B managers
People from Veurne
Footballers from West Flanders